Sint-Maartensdijk is a village in the Dutch province of Zeeland. It is a part of the municipality of Tholen, and lies about 16 km west of Bergen op Zoom.

History 
Sint-Maartensdijk was founded as 'Haestinge', and renamed when it got a church dedicated to Martin of Tours. The first lords of Sint-Maartensdijk resided at Sint-Maartensdijk Castle which was demolished in 1819. The castle was located just north of the town walls, and its southern moat is still visible.

Sint-Maartensdijk was a separate municipality until 1971, when it was merged with Tholen.

Born in Sint-Maartensdijk
Keetie van Oosten-Hage (born 1949), former cyclist
Cornelius Vermuyden (1595–1677), engineer
The Ghanaian politician Alfred Vanderpuije is descended from a Sint-Maartensdijk family

Gallery

References

Populated places in Zeeland
Former municipalities of Zeeland
Tholen